Killywool (possibly ) is a small village and townland in County Londonderry, Northern Ireland. In the 2001 Census it had a population of 132 people. It is situated within Causeway Coast and Glens district.

References 

NI Neighbourhood Information System

Villages in County Londonderry
Causeway Coast and Glens district